is a Japanese manga series written and illustrated by Kousuke Satake. It started serialization in Young Magazine the 3rd in November 2016, before moving to Monthly Young Magazine following Young Magazine the 3rd publishing its final issue. As of August 2022, its individual chapters have been collected into ten volumes. An anime adaptation has been announced.

Media

Manga
The series is written and illustrated by Kousuke Satake, and started serialization in Young Magazine the 3rd on November 6, 2016. Following Young Magazine the 3rd publishing its final issue in April 2021, the series was moved to the new Monthly Young Magazine. The first tankōbon volume was released on September 20, 2017. As of August 2022, the individual chapters have been collected into ten tankōbon volumes.

At New York Comic Con 2019, Kodansha USA announced they licensed the series for English publication.

Volume list

Anime
In August 2022, it was announced that the series would be receiving an anime adaptation.

Reception
As part of Anime News Network's Fall 2021 manga guide, Rebecca Silverman and Caitlin Moore reviewed the first volume for the website. They both praised the art and concept, while also being critical of how the concept of the series is executed. Sarah from Anime UK News also praised the artwork, while criticizing the characters. Contrary to other critics, Che Gilson from Otaku USA praised the plot and setting in addition to the artwork.

The series has over 500,000 copies in circulation.

References

External links
  
 

Adventure anime and manga
Anime series based on manga
Dark fantasy anime and manga
Kodansha manga
Seinen manga
Thriller anime and manga
Witchcraft in anime and manga
Witchcraft in written fiction